Lobster is a French novella by Guillaume Lecasble. It was published in Paris by Les Éditions du Seuil in 2003, and has been translated into English and Spanish.

Reception

Nicholas Lezard, in The Guardian, said of the English translation: "there was a Lobster-shaped hole in world literature which has now been neatly filled by this remarkable work". In The Daily Telegraph, Sam Leith put it in a list of 'Mad Stuff'. Kirkus Reviews called it a "brief, bizarre, boiling broth of surrealism, romantic fatalism and slapstick", and Publishers Weekly said it was "both tender and appalling".

References

2005 French novels
Éditions du Seuil books
French erotic novels
French novellas
Novels about animals
Novels about RMS Titanic